Glenn Robert Davis (October 28, 1914 – September 21, 1988) was a member of the United States House of Representatives for Wisconsin. He represented Wisconsin's 2nd congressional district from April 22, 1947 to January 3, 1957, and Wisconsin's 9th congressional district from January 3, 1965 to December 31, 1974.

Early life and education
Davis was born on a small farm to a poor family in Vernon, Wisconsin. He excelled academically despite pressure from his father to forsake school for farming. He skipped several grades and was a teacher of the younger children in his one-room school house before he graduated three years early from Mukwonago High School in 1930 at 15.

Davis attended the Platteville State Teachers College (now the University of Wisconsin–Platteville) with a donation from his mother (who had been hiding the money from her husband for just such an occasion). He majored in education and went on to teach high school at Cottage Grove and Waupun for five years. Davis then went back to school, earning a law degree from the University of Wisconsin–Madison in 1940.

After passing the bar, Davis opened a law firm in Waukesha, Wisconsin. From this perch, he launched his first campaign for public office, with a successful bid for the Wisconsin State Assembly in 1940.

He later lived in New Berlin, Wisconsin, and Wauwatosa, Wisconsin.

Military service
After a year in the legislature, Davis resigned his seat to join the U.S. Navy, after the Japanese attack on Pearl Harbor. Lieutenant Davis served as the Communications officer aboard the USS Sangamon (CVE-26), an escort carrier. The ship sustained a kamikaze attack in the latter days of the war off of Okinawa. Although a third of the crew were casualties, Davis was uninjured.

Political career
Davis resumed the practice of law after being honorably discharged from the Navy, on December 12, 1945. He also stepped up his involvement in politics, serving briefly as a local court commissioner and attending Republican Party functions. Davis was elected as a delegate to every Republican National Convention from 1952 to 1972.

In 1947, Davis ran in the special election to succeed Robert Kirkland Henry, a Republican congressman who died just weeks after being elected to a second term. Davis served five terms in the House of Representatives representing Wisconsin's 2nd congressional district, before deciding to seek higher office in 1956. Instead of running for reelection, he launched an unsuccessful primary challenge to incumbent Republican Senator Alexander Wiley.

In 1957, Davis lobbied unsuccessfully to become the GOP candidate in the special election to replace the late Senator Joseph McCarthy. The Republican nod instead went to former Gov. Walter J. Kohler Jr., who went on to lose the seat to Democrat William Proxmire. Davis subsequently returned to his law practice.

Eight years later, in 1964, Davis made a successful comeback bid by winning the open ninth congressional district created by reapportionment. He served another four terms before losing in the 1974 primary to a conservative up-and-comer, State Senator Bob Kasten. Davis felt he was hurt by the then-unpopular pardon of Richard Nixon by then President Gerald Ford on the Sunday before the primary election. Davis had been closely associated with Ford.

Davis's congressional service was marked by a generally conservative record that grew more moderate in the early 1970s. He achieved perhaps his greatest mark as a close friend and golf partner of House Minority Leader Gerald Ford. Davis was also the star shortstop for the "Washington Senators," a recreational baseball team made up solely of congressmen.

To this day, Davis remains the sole native of Waukesha County to have held congressional office.

Later years
After his loss in the primary, Davis resigned on December 31, 1974—just days before his term would have otherwise ended. He moved permanently to Arlington, Virginia. Davis worked as a consultant for Potter International, Inc. from 1975 to 1983. He died in Arlington on September 21, 1988.

Part of Davis's legacy is the Glenn R. Davis Charitable Foundation, a scholarship organization funded and administered by his family. The Glenn Davis Charitable Foundation gives a monetary award to one graduating student in each Waukesha County high school every year. The award is granted to a student who has done something to overcome substantial obstacles, reflecting Davis's own rise from a family of pickle farmers to U.S. congressman.

Family
Glenn Davis' son J. Mac Davis formerly served as a Wisconsin Circuit Court judge, Waukesha County, and a Wisconsin State Senator.

References
Smith, Kevin B., "The Iron Man: The Life and Times of Congressman Glenn R. Davis". Lanham, Md.; University Press of America and Glenn Davis Charitable Foundation, Ltd., 1994.
Office of the Clerk. U.S. House of Representatives. Election Statistics

External links

1914 births
1988 deaths
People from Vernon, Wisconsin
Members of the Wisconsin State Assembly
University of Wisconsin Law School alumni
Virginia Republicans
Republican Party members of the United States House of Representatives from Wisconsin
20th-century American politicians
University of Wisconsin–Platteville alumni
People from Waukesha, Wisconsin
People from Wauwatosa, Wisconsin
People from New Berlin, Wisconsin